Țiganiada is a Romanian epic poem written by the poet and scholar Ion Budai-Deleanu, the first epic poem written in the Romanian language.

Țiganiada treats an allegorical subject with satirical tendencies, antifeudal and anticlerical, being a complex and unexpectedly modern literary work that contains a significant amount of Enlightenment ideas.

Budai-Deleanu used Romanian words of Slavic origin to make it sound more ancient. It includes twelve songs in 1381 stanzas.

References

Epic poems in Romanian